Eagles of Death Metal: Nos Amis (Our Friends) is a 2017 documentary film about the American rock band of the same name.

References

2017 films
HBO documentary films
Documentaries about music
2010s English-language films
2010s American films